Tiffin is an Indian English word for a type of meal. It refers to a light breakfast or a light tea-time meal at about 3 p.m.,  consisting of typical tea-time foods. In certain parts of India, it can also refer to the midday luncheon or, in some regions of the Indian subcontinent, a between-meal snack. When used in place of the word "lunch", however, it does not necessarily mean a light meal.

Etymology
In the British Raj, tiffin was used to denote the British custom of afternoon tea that had been supplanted by the Indian practice of having a light meal at that hour. It is derived from "tiffing", an English colloquial term meaning to take a little drink. By 1867 it had become naturalised among Anglo-Indians in northern British India to mean luncheon.

Current usage

In South India and in Nepal, tiffin is generally a snack between meals: dosas, idlis, vadas etc. In other parts of India, such as Mumbai, the word mostly refers to a packed lunch of some sort. In Mumbai, it is often delivered to them by dabbawalas, sometimes known as tiffin wallahs, who use a complex system to get thousands of tiffin carriers to their destinations. In most of India, a school-going child's lunch box is fondly called a tiffin box.

When used in place of the word "lunch", tiffin often consists of rice, lentils, curry, vegetables, chapatis or "spicy meats". In addition, the lunch boxes are themselves called tiffin carriers, tiffin-boxes or just tiffins.

See also

 Bento
 Dosirak
 Lunchbox
 Tiffin carrier
 Tiffin (confectionery)

Notes

References

Meals
Indian cuisine
Indian English idioms
Indian slang